Zelal Cola is a cola brand produced and marketed by Akcan GmbH of Germany.

External links
Official site

Cola brands